Rajdahri is a town, and one of twenty union councils in Battagram District in Khyber Pakhtunkhwa province of Pakistan. It is located at 34°40'60N 73°5'60E and has an altitude of 1408 metres (4622 feet).

References

Union councils of Battagram District
Populated places in Battagram District